Texas All-Star Wrestling (TASW) is a professional wrestling promotion that was established by Bob Murphy in Humble, Texas in 1994. It is the oldest independent promotion in the state of Texas and one of three based in the Greater Houston area along with Booker T's Reality of Wrestling and Lone Star Championship Wrestling.

It was the first successful wrestling promotion to open in Texas following the close World Class Championship Wrestling in 1990, and the Global Wrestling Federation in 1994. It not only remained the only major "indy" promotion in the state during the 1990s but is one of the oldest wrestling promotions in operation in the United States. The promotion has been profiled by both the Houston Press and the Houston Chronicle. Ken Hoffman, a longtime columnist for the Chronicle, has participated in several wrestling matches for charity. The Galveston County Daily News has called TASW the top promotion in the entire state.

Necro Butcher and Shawn Hernandez, both started their careers in TASW. Samoa Joe, Harlem Heat 2000 (Big T and Stevie Ray) from World Championship Wrestling, and Tammy Lynn Sytch, Christy Hemme and Daivari from World Wrestling Entertainment have all made appearances for the promotion as well as older wrestlers such as Abdullah the Butcher, Kamala and "Hacksaw" Jim Duggan, the latter holding the promotion's heavyweight title in 2003.

History

Background and early history
Texas All-Star Wrestling was started by Bob Murphy, a 10-year veteran who wrestled throughout Texas during the 1980s, who grew frustrated with the unethical business practices of small-time promoters following the collapse of the NWA territory system at the end of the decade. With the civic center yet to be built, he considered using Humble High School or another venue in the local area. Murphy and his then tag team partner rented out a bingo hall by U.S. Route 59 in Humble, Texas and promised the owner, Casey Musick, $500 plus the proceeds from the concession stand. Renaming the building the "Humble Bingo Arena", they held their first show on January 15, 1994, which was attended by 450 fans and brought in over $2,000. The promotion established its first championship titles between December 1994 and December 1996.

Professional wrestling had been very popular in Houston, especially during the 1970s and 1980s, but had considerably declined in the years following the retirement of legendary wrestling personality Paul Boesch in 1987. It was not until the close of World Class Championship Wrestling in 1990, and the Global Wrestling Federation in 1994, that Murphy began promoting wrestling events after an absence of several years. It was the first successful independent promotion in Texas and, with the exception of occasional events held by Tugboat Taylor at Hofheinz Pavilion, remained the only organization in the entire state for nearly a decade.

The shows immediately found an audience with its traditional Southern-style wrestling, rather than the "sports entertainment" favored by mainstream promotions such as World Championship Wrestling and the World Wrestling Federation, and established a strong and loyal following in the Greater Houston area. Many fans were so enthusiastic at the events that many wanted to participate themselves prompting Murphy to open a small gym in the back of the Humble Bingo Arena in 1996. Within two years, this eventually evolved into the present-day training facility and wrestling school where many of the top wrestlers on the Texas "indy" circuit would be trained, most notably, Shawn "Hot Stuff" Hernandez. Prospective students of the school were required to volunteer at events in roles such as refereeing matches, escorting wrestlers to the ring as a "valet" or acting as security for several months prior to their first match. The entire training period generally took six months to one year, though some students graduated within four to five months.

Humongous defended the TASW Heavyweight Championship against Abdullah the Butcher at the Humble Bingo Arena on March 22, 1997. Older veterans such as "Mean" Mike Tatum, "Hacksaw" Jim Duggan and Kamala the Ugandan Giant also had short stints in the promotion. Both Tatum and Duggan held the TASW Heavyweight Championship during the early-2000s. Although speculated to become a major promotion, Murphy himself said in interviews that he was unconcerned about the expansion of the company and instead wanted to focus on developing younger locally based talent and "help them make it to the next level". In addition to its Houston-based roster, Texas independent wrestlers Rasta Savage and Necro Butcher also regularly competed in the promotion. Later stars to emerge during the next decade included Bobby 2-Badd, Mr. Mayhem, Zen-Zen, VooDoo the Xecutioner, Nasty Nick Daniels, Dylan Starr and Nark the Nevulon. River City Wrestling's Joey "Super Shot" Spector, an alumnus of the Texas Wrestling Academy, also wrestled for the promotion early in his career.

Ken Hoffman and The Houston Chronicle
On January 16, 1999, at the TASW's 6th annual "Rumble in Humble" supercard, Houston Chronicle columnist Ken Hoffman made his pro wrestling debut against The Jester in the opening bout; he not only lost the match but had to be carried out of the ring on a stretcher. Hoffman had previously covered the promotion during the mid-1990s and would continue to make occasional appearances over the next few years donating his prize money to charities. The journalist was signed to a series of Texas Death-style matches, with no referee present and "anything goes", against The Jester. These matches were held at the Silverwings Ballroom in Brenham on February 13, the Civic Center in Diboll on March 5, the Humble Bingo Arena on March 6, in Port Lavaca on March 13 and at Spring High School in Spring, Texas on March 20, 1999. Miss Hooters Girl 1999 winner Alisa Wong was his valet for these matches.

That summer, the promotion began producing a weekly late-night series which aired on KNWS-TV. Hoffman also made a return at the "Rumble in Humble" where he unexpectedly won the TASW Cruiserweight Championship in a Three-Way Dance with Bones and "Loverboy" Joey Corman. He was helped in his victory due to outside interference from Alisa Wong and his manager Sean "The Cablinasian" Pendergast. Hoffman also entered the "Humble Rumble", a 20-man battle royale for $15,000 and a title shot against then TASW Heavyweight Champion "Mean" Mike Tatum, but quickly eliminated himself after entering the ring. He retained the title in a rematch with Bones on February 12 and successfully defended the title for six months against opponents such as Brother Icarus, Bonez and the Jester until finally surrendering the title to TASW promoter Bob Murphy that summer.

21st century
By 2000, TASW was regularly drawing between 300 and 800 fans each month at its home arena in Humble and also promoted shows in other cities outside Harris County and Houston including Texas City, Baytown, Port Lavaca, Brenham and El Campo. In August of that year, a story on Murphy and TASW was featured in the Houston Press and profiled several its top stars including female wrestlers Skyler and Nadia Payne, Big Daddy from Cincinnati, Mini Stuff, Mr. Fu Ku, Spanish Fly, "Playboy" Joey Corman, Rasta Savage, Necro Butcher and Shawn Hernandez. The story received a positive response from readers, however, Warriors of Wrestling (World of Wrestling) promoter wrote a letter to the editor criticizing the article for its "lack of research and professionalism" as well as the TASW for its inappropriate fan behavior. She requested the newspaper provide "equal exposure" and invited the author, Jesse Washington, to attend an upcoming show.

A year later, "Hacksaw" Jim Duggan wrestled for the promotion during the summer and early fall of 2001. During this first stint with TASW, Duggan feuded Harlem Heat 2000 (Big T and Stevie Ray) from World Championship Wrestling. Kamala and Mike Tatum headlined a TASW show at the Humble Bingo Arena on February 22, 2003. Later that year, the promotion held a memorial show for one of its former stars and official announcer, Brother Icarus, at the arena on October 4, 2003. Ken Hoffman, who had wrestled him two years before, wrote a column in memory of his passing. He recalled in a later column that during the match he secretly had Jim Adler, a celebrity TV attorney known as the "Tough Texas Lawyer", interfere in the match on his behalf. He ordered Brother Icarus to stop attacking Hoffman, who had been choking him and pulling his hair, and threatened to have Icarus arrested for assault and battery. When fans began booing, Adler threatened to subpoena the entire audience as witnesses. This distraction allowed Hoffman to roll-up his opponent for the victory and quickly escaped with the belt.

The promotion was praised by The Galveston County Daily News, the oldest newspaper of record in the state of Texas, as "the best-run independent group in the state" and crediting Bob Murphy for keeping TASW out of the well-publicized feuding seen among rival Texas promotions. Scott E. Williams, a journalist for The Galveston County Daily News, wrote in early-2004 that TASW was "arguably the top independent wrestling group in the entire state". On January 10, 2004, several TASW wrestlers participated in a show for High Impact Wrestling at Texas City’s Nessler Center headlined by Johnny Blade and Kamala. The event also served as the professional wrestling debut of Scott E. Williams who agreed to participate as the special guest referee in the main event in exchange for a donation to The Daily News’ United Way fund. On June 5, Tom Prichard, the top talent scout for World Wrestling Entertainment, conducted a "no-holds-barred" clinic at TASW's wrestling school in Humble. Also that summer, Jim Duggan returned to the promotion and, at the August 7th "Tomball Streetfight" supercard, defeated TASW Heavyweight Champion Zen-Zen for the title. At the time of its 11th anniversary at the 2005 "Humble Rumble", Williams wrote "In addition to being one of the country’s longest-lived independents, TASW has become the best one in Texas".

Recent years
On May 20, 2007, the promotion had its first card at the Armadillo Event Center where it held a 10-man "Hardcore Street Fight" inside a steel cage as the main event. The promotion and its school was again featured in the Houston Chronicle three months later. Scoby Gober, a three-time TASW Hardcore Champion, was interviewed for the story. On October 13, Ken Hoffman also made a return appearance as TASW's "SlamFest '07" supercard where he and Sean Pendergast won the TASW Tag Team Championship from Scoby Gober & Bones in a Triple Threat match with Nate Slater & Rocco Carmanooch at the Humble Bingo Arena. Like his previous victory, Hoffman was helped by valet Alisa Wong and manager Sheik Ali Ramzanali. Both men donated their prize money to charity. On December 8, 2007, Tammy Lynn Sytch made an appearance at the "Seasons Beatings" supercard at the Humble Bingo Arena. That same month, The Houston Press covered a TASW event at the Armadillo Events Center featuring Spider Boy, whom the author referred to as "the world's laziest Spider-Man", in a match with Steve "Bones" Monckton.

In February 2008, the Houston Chronicle also covered the Texas All-Star Wrestling's 15th-annual "Humble Rumble" where a photo was taken of "BLT" Bubba Lee Travis and an 8-year-old child attending the event with his father. The event boasted a sold-out crowd and was one of the promotion's biggest show of the new year. The following month at "Scar Wars", Daivari who was originally there for an autograph signing but was later involved in an altercation with Dylan Starr which led to impromptu match between the two. Later that night, he became involved in a post-match brawl after Starr interfered in a Triple Threat match between Hector Montoya, Nasty Nick Daniels and TASW Cruiserweight Champion Chip Dumas causing a no-contest.

The promotion celebrated its 16th anniversary at the 2009 "Humble Rumble" at the Humble Bingo Arena on January 10, 2009. At the end of the year, TexasIndyWrestling.com ranked Texas All-Star Wrestling #5 of the top ten wrestling promotions in Texas.

TASW Heavyweight Championship

The TASW Heavyweight Championship is a professional wrestling heavyweight championship in Texas All-Star Wrestling. It is the main championship title established in TASW, having been introduced in 1995, and remains the oldest active championship in the state of Texas.

The inaugural champion was Humungous (Bob Murphy), who defeated Dynamite Dixon in a tournament final on November 18, 1995 to become the first TASW Heavyweight Champion. Mr. Mayhem holds the record for most reigns, with three. He also holds the distinction of being the only champion never to have been pinned for the title. At 735 days, ZenZen's second reign is the longest in the title's history. Steve Demarco's second reign was the shortest in the history of the title as he lost it minutes after he won it. Bret Basics was the youngest wrestler ever to hold the title. Overall, there have been 42 reigns shared between 31 wrestlers, with eight vacancies.

Key

TASW Cruiserweight Championship

The TASW Cruiserweight Championship is a professional wrestling championship in Texas All-Star Wrestling. It is the main cruiserweight championship title established in TASW, having been introduced in 1994, and remains the oldest active championship in the state of Texas.

The inaugural champion was Rico Suave, who defeated Witchita Willie in a tournament final on December 22, 1994 to become the first TASW Cruiserweight Champion. Willie also holds the record for most reigns, with three. Ken Hoffman, a reporter for the Houston Chronicle is a former champion and donated his prize money to charity. He successfully defended the title for six months before surrendering the belt to promoter Bob Murphy. At 427 days, Estrella Galactica's third reign is the longest in the title's history. Thunder Jet's first and only reign was the shortest in the history of the title being stripped of the belt only 7 days after winning the title. Overall, there have been 50 reigns shared between 38 wrestlers, with eight vacancies.

Key

TASW Tag Team Championship

The TASW Tag Team Championship is a professional wrestling tag team championship contested in Texas All-Star Wrestling (TASW). It was the third of four championship titles established in TASW, having been introduced in 1996, and remains the oldest active tag team championship in the state of Texas.

The inaugural champions were Natural Born Killers (Rico Suave and G.Q. Knight), who defeated Top Guns (Ace and Jag) on December 7, 1996 to become the first TASW Tag Team Champions. No team has ever won the championship more than once. Scoby Gober, however, has the most individual reigns with 3. At 882 days, The Pump Patrol's first and only reign is the longest in the title's history. Brutality Inc.'s (Ken Hoffman and Sean Pendergast) only reign was the shortest in the history of the title lasting only 35 days. Both men were reporters from the Houston Chronicle and donated their prize money to charity upon winning the title. 

Key

TASW Women's Championship

The TASW Women's Championship is a professional wrestling tag team championship contested in Texas All-Star Wrestling (TASW). It was introduced in 2019.

The inaugural champion was Killa Kate, who defeated Phoebe & Livi Loca on September 7, 2019 to become the first TASW Women's Champion. Currently she is the only person to have held the championship.

Key

References

External links
TASWwrestling.com

Independent professional wrestling promotions based in Texas
Entertainment companies established in 1994
Professional wrestling in Houston